Hanina bar Papi, or Hanina bar Pappai, (Hebrew חנינא בר פפי) was a third generation Jewish Amora sage of the Land of Israel. It is possible that he is the same person as Hanina ben Pappa who is frequently mentioned in Talmudic stories.

Biography
He was among the young students of R. Yochanan bar Nafcha.

His rabbinic peers considered him an example of a righteous man, known to have withstood temptation. They had in mind a story where a certain royal woman urged Hanina into illicit relations with her. In order to deter her, he pronounced a certain magical formula, whereupon his body was covered with boils and scabs, but the woman removed the disease by magic. He fled and hid himself in a bath-house with demons, knowing that the woman would not chase after him to such a place, since it was a place which whoever entered it was would suffer harm. After this his colleagues asked him: Who guarded you? and he replied: Two angels guarded me all night.

His colleagues were R. Abbahu, R. Isaac Nappaha, Rabbi Ammi, and Rav Zeira. Among his pupils were R. Elai  and R. Adda b. Abimi.

References

Talmud rabbis of the Land of Israel